The Alpes Cottiae (English: 'Cottian Alps') were a small province of the Roman Empire founded in 63 AD by Emperor Nero. It was one of the three provinces straddling the Alps between modern France and Italy, along with the Alpes Graiae et Poeninae and Alpes Maritimae.

The capital of the province was Segusio (modern Susa, Piedmont). Other important settlements were located at Eburodunum and Brigantio (Briançon). Named after the 1st-century BC ruler of the region, Marcus Julius Cottius, the toponym survives today in the Cottian Alps.

History
The province had its origin in a local chiefdom controlled by the enfranchised king Marcus Julius Donnus, who ruled over Ligurian tribes of the region by the middle of the 1st century BC. He was succeeded by his son, Marcus Julius Cottius, who offered no opposition to the integration of his realm into the Roman imperial system under Emperor Augustus in 15–14 BC, then kept on ruling on native tribes as a praefectus civitatium of a Regnum Cotti.

After the death of his son Cottius II in 63 AD, the region was annexed by Emperor Nero and made into a procuratorial province known as provincia Alpium Cottiarum.

During the reign of Diocletian (284–305), the western part of the province was transferred to the Alpes Maritimae, and the eastern part allocated under a praeses to the Diocese of Italy.

Settlements
Settlements in Alpes Cottiae included: 
 Ad Fines (Malano) ("mansio", customs post)
 Ocelum (Celle) ("oppidum", Celtic village)
 Ad Duodecimum (Saint-Didier) ("mutatio")
 Segusio (Susa) (capital)
 Venausio (Venaus) (oppidum)
 Scingomagus / Excingomagus (Exilles) (oppidum, possibly Donnus's capital) 
 Caesao / Goesao (Cesana Torinese) ("castrum")
 Ad Martes Ultor (late imperial "Ulcense") (Oulx) ("castrum")
 Brigantium (Briançon) (mansio)
 Mons Matronae (Mont Genèvre)

See also 
 Cottius
 Donnus
 Cottian Alps

References

Bibliography

Further reading 
 Tilmann Bechert: Die Provinzen des römischen Reiches: Einführung und Überblick. von Zabern, Mainz 1999.
 Bartolomasi : Valsusa Antica . Alzani, 1975.

Provinces of the Roman Empire
Tres Alpes
60s establishments in the Roman Empire
476 disestablishments
470s disestablishments in the Roman Empire